Sahil may refer to:

 Sahil, Azerbaijan, a municipality in Baku, Azerbaijan
 Sahil (Baku Metro), a metro station of the Baku Metro
 Sahil, Saudi Arabia, a city in the governorate of Bareq, Saudi Arabia
 Sahil, Somaliland, a region of Somaliland
 Sahil (name), an Indian  name (including a list of people with the name)
 Sahil (film), a 1959 Indian film